Ashford is a town in Houston County, Alabama, United States. It is part of the Dothan, Alabama Metropolitan Statistical Area. The town was incorporated in June 1891. For most of its history, it was a center for naval stores production, pulpwood harvesting, and cotton agriculture. The population was 2,148 at the 2010 census, up from 1,853 at the 2000 census.

Geography
Ashford is located slightly northeast of the center of Houston County at  (31.184032, -85.235286). U.S. Route 84 passes through the southern part of the town, leading west  to Dothan and southeast  to Donalsonville, Georgia.

History

In March 1888, the Alabama Midland Railway built a small depot of Victorian railroad architecture in Ashford to be a waystation along the Bainbridge-to-Montgomery route. The depot was the only building to survive the 1915 fire that destroyed the rest of the town. The original depot received additions at least twice—an enclosed warehouse and open loading dock were added to the east, followed by racially segregated passenger waiting rooms on the west side. The depot faced two sidings that served for loading turpentine from the Adams Company still one block away, and pulpwood. Cotton bales, fertilizer, and a single sweet potato crop were loaded from both sidings.

The depot changed hands as railroads consolidated. The Alabama Midland was absorbed by the Atlantic Coast Line, which merged in the 1980s with the Seaboard Air Line to form the Seaboard Coast Line. CSX Transportation later bought the Seaboard Coast Line. Ashford Depot had fallen into disrepair after it closed in 1978. In the 1980s, concerned citizens founded a preservation committee, led by Jimmy Burgess, and received a grant to add a new roof to the building. This committee also placed the depot on the Alabama Register of Historical Places. It remained active into the 1990s. Former Mayor Bryan Alloway revived the depot preservation committee after his 2000 election. This committee planned to incorporate and seek tax-exempt status in 2005. It received two US Department of Transportation grants ($850,000), two Alabama Department of Economic and Community Affairs grants ($290,000), and one Alabama Resource Conservation & Development (RC&D) grant ($7500) to thoroughly renovate the depot. Construction began in fall 2004. The committee and Ashford City officials held a ribbon-cutting ceremony on November 17, 2005, to mark the end of Phase I of the reconstruction. Now the depot can be used for reunions, birthdays, and social events that the city might sponsor.

On October 10, 2018, Hurricane Michael's western eye wall passed thru the City of Ashford causing major damage and left 100% of the city without power.  No injuries or fatalities were associated with the storm.

Government

The current mayor is Carole Barfield, and City Council members are Place 1 - John Wayne Massey, Place 2 - Ronnie L. Whitehead, Place 3 - Alan Anderson, Place 4 - Blake Rosenkoetter, Place 5 - James Edward Smith.  The City Clerk is Janet Rumley.

The police chief is Malvin Anderson, who supervises four full-time police officers; the fire chief is Jimmy Posey. The fire department and rescue squad are all volunteers.

The City of Ashford's website is City of Ashford, Official Website

Previous mayors of the City of Ashford:
Jonathon Grecu,
Rusty Burgess,
Bryan Alloway

2020 Election:

Mayor - Carole Barfield 257 votes (57%)   Gary Gibson 194 votes  (43%)

Place 1 -  John Wayne Massey (unopposed)

Place 2 - Ronnie L. Whitehead 257 votes  (58%)   Benji McWaters 186  (42%)

Place 3 - Alan Anderson 254 votes  (60%)   Gerald L. Williams 172 votes  (40%)

Place 4 - Blake Rosenkoetter 258 votes  (59%)   Terry A. Smith 176 votes  (41%)

Place 5 - James Edward Smith 213 votes  (50%)   Richard Bolden 145 votes  (34%)   Jimmy R. Weems 65 votes  (15%)

Education

  

Ashford schools are part of the Houston County Board of Education. Ashford has one elementary school for grades K-5 and a high school for grades 6-12. The schools mascot is known as the yellow jackets named Buzz.  The current principal of Ashford Elementary School is Sharon LeRoy and the principal of Ashford High School is Dr. Donnie Chambers.

Ashford Academy was once a private school that closed its doors at the end of the 2014–2015 school year.

Recreation
The City of Ashford offers recreation activities throughout the year, including baseball, softball, soccer, and basketball.  The Ashford Recreation Sports Association Ashford Recreation - Powered by Dixie Youth Baseball organizes and raises funds to support the programs.  They are a nonprofit 501c3 organization and is a parent run organization dedicated to help operate the Ashford Recreation Department by raising funds and coordinating efforts of the department, coaches, parents and sponsors.  Football and cheerleading is organized through the Ashford Youth Sports Association.  Both organizations are nonprofit and are parent driven.  The recreation ball fields are located behind Ashford High School on 8th Avenue.  The recreation park includes T-Ball, softball, and baseball fields.  Basketball is played at Ashford Elementary School.  In 2015, Ashford hosted the 2015 Alabama State Class "A" Baseball Tournament.  In 2021, the Ashford recreation boys 8u all-star team won the state championship in Tuscaloosa, Alabama, and then went on to Laurel, Mississippi to play in the 2021 Dixie Youth World Series where they finished 3rd in the class AA division.

Demographics

Town of Ashford

Ashford first appeared on the 1900 U.S. Census as an incorporated town, then in Henry County. In 1903, Ashford was shifted into the new county of Houston. See also Ashford Precinct below.

2000 Census data
As of the census of 2000, there were 1,853 people, 763 households, and 527 families residing in the city. The racial makeup of the city was 71.45% White, 27.52% Black or African American, 0.70% Native American, 0.05% Asian, and 0.27% from two or more races. 1.51% of the population were Hispanic or Latino of any race.

There were 763 households, out of which 30.1% had children under the age of 18 living with them, 52.3% were married couples living together, 14.0% had a female householder with no husband present, and 30.9% were non-families. 29.0% of all households were made up of individuals, and 16.8% had someone living alone who was 65 years of age or older. The average household size was 2.43 and the average family size was 2.99.

In the city the population was spread out, with 25.1% under the age of 18, 7.1% from 18 to 24, 26.2% from 25 to 44, 24.2% from 45 to 64, and 17.4% who were 65 years of age or older. The median age was 39 years. For every 100 females, there were 83.5 males. For every 100 females age 18 and over, there were 76.8 males.

The median income for a household in the city was $29,444, and the median income for a family was $40,313. Males had a median income of $30,167 versus $22,286 for females. The per capita income for the city was $15,135. About 11.3% of families and 16.9% of the population were below the poverty line, including 18.5% of those under age 18 and 27.7% of those age 65 or over.

2010 census
As of the census of 2010, there were 2,148 people, 867 households, and 623 families residing in the city. The racial makeup of the city was 79.0% White, 19.5% Black or African American, 0.2% Native American, 0.2% Asian, and 0.7% from two or more races. .8% of the population were Hispanic or Latino of any race.

There were 867 households, out of which 27.8% had children under the age of 18 living with them, 51.6% were married couples living together, 14.4% had a female householder with no husband present, and 28.1% were non-families. 24.8% of all households were made up of individuals, and 13.3% had someone living alone who was 65 years of age or older. The average household size was 2.48 and the average family size was 2.94.

In the city the population was spread out, with 23.7% under the age of 18, 9.0% from 18 to 24, 21.7% from 25 to 44, 28.2% from 45 to 64, and 17.4% who were 65 years of age or older. The median age was 41.2 years. For every 100 females, there were 91.1 males. For every 100 females age 18 and over, there were 94.0 males.

The median income for a household in the city was $35,709, and the median income for a family was $55,833. Males had a median income of $38,654 versus $27,143 for females. The per capita income for the city was $21,444. About 9.1% of families and 14.3% of the population were below the poverty line, including 21.5% of those under age 18 and 15.5% of those age 65 or over.

2020 census

As of the 2020 United States census, there were 2,246 people, 865 households, and 635 families residing in the town.

Ashford Precinct/Division (1900-70)

Ashford Precinct was first created in 1900, then as the 19th precinct of Henry County. In 1903, Ashford was shifted into the new county of Houston and its precinct was renumbered the 10th. In 1960, it was reorganized into a census division. In 1980, the Ashford Census Division was merged into the Dothan Census Division.

Notable person
 Robert Stewart, former Arena Football League player

References 

Towns in Alabama
Towns in Houston County, Alabama
Dothan metropolitan area, Alabama